The Franklin Mint is a private mint founded by Joseph Segel in 1964 in Wawa, Pennsylvania. The building is in Middletown Township.

The brand name was previously owned by Sequential Brands Group headquartered in New York City, New York. It is currently owned by Retail Ecommerce Ventures (REV). The Franklin Mint sells coins, medals, jewelry, die-cast vehicles, dolls, sculpture and other collectibles.

History 
For five decades The Franklin Mint produced and mass marketed "collectibles". Its product line began with manufacturing and marketing privately minted gold and silver commemorative rounds and medallions. 

In the 1970s and 1980s, Franklin Mint expanded operations to legal tender coins, producing a combination of bullion and non-bullion proof and uncirculated coin sets of both small and large denominations for a number of countries, particularly Panama and various island states. One of its best numismatic sellers was the "Coin Sets of all Nations" series which included stamps and post marks of the respective nation on each set.

Besides coins, other offerings included dolls, plates, knives, LP record sets and die-cast vehicles. Often emphasized in these media were influential historical figures or famous actors. Wildlife scenes were also a common feature. Many of these items were sold through magazine and television advertisement over the years.

One of the LP sets was the 100 Greatest Recordings Of All Time, a collection of classical recordings selected by a panel of performers and conductors and pressed on translucent 180 gram deep red vinyl and packaged two LPs to each album. Each LP was set into a plastic carrier that touched only the center spindle hole and the rim. There were two rereleases of this set. The second used ordinary paper sleeves inside a foldout compartment to house the LPs. The third used a side-open box and paper sleeves. In all three sets the vinyl quality was the same.

The Franklin Library
The Franklin Library produced public domain classic books from its founding in 1973 until closing in 2000. Its books were designed and bound by The Sloves Organization, Ltd. The Franklin Library published a number of book series including the Great Books of the Western World and The Hundred Greatest Books of All Time.

Vehicle models 
In 1983, after Warner Communications had purchased The Franklin Mint, the company entered the diecast vehicle market, starting with the 1935 Mercedes Benz 500K Roadster. Usually the cars were labeled as Franklin Mint Precision Models. In the following years, Franklin Mint produced more than 600 different issues of motorcycles, trucks and tractors besides automobiles.

Additionally The Franklin Mint began manufacturing diecast aircraft. They produced a large number of World War II 1:48 scale planes including the B-17 Flying Fortress, PBY Catalina, P-51 Mustang, and FW190.

Changes in ownership

In 1980, Warner Communications (now part of WarnerMedia) purchased The Franklin Mint for about $225 million. The combination was short lived: Warner sold The Franklin Mint in 1985 to American Protection Industries Inc. (API) for $167.5 million. However, Warner retained Eastern Mountain Sports, a retailer that The Franklin Mint had acquired in the 1970s, as well as The Franklin Mint Center, which it leased back to API. API was renamed Roll International in 1993. During the early 2000s, Roll International wound down much of the Franklin Mint business. On August 31, 2006, Roll International Corp sold the remaining assets of The Franklin Mint to a group including private equity investors led by M. Moshe Malamud, David Salzman and Steven J. Sisskind, who have extensive experience in the art, collectibles, media, entertainment and direct marketing industries. The Franklin Mint brand was purchased in November 2013 by Sequential Brands Group. It was later acquired by Retail Ecommerce Ventures (REV) in July 2020, a holding company that was founded by former NASA scientist Alex Mehr and his business partner, serial entrepreneur Tai Lopez.

On March 2, 2023, Retail Ecommerce Ventures, The Franklin Mint's current parent, announced that it was mulling a possible bankruptcy filing.

Diana, Princess of Wales Memorial Fund vs Franklin Mint 
Following the death of Diana, Princess of Wales, the Diana, Princess of Wales Memorial Fund was granted intellectual property rights over her image. In 1998, after refusing the Franklin Mint an official license to produce Diana merchandise, the fund sued the company, accusing it of illegally selling Diana dolls, plates and jewelry. In California, where the initial case was tried, a suit to preserve the right of publicity may be filed on behalf of a dead person, but only if that person is a Californian. The Memorial Fund therefore filed the lawsuit on behalf of the estate, and upon losing the case, was countersued by Franklin Mint in 2003. In November 2004, the case was settled out of court with the Diana Memorial Fund agreeing to pay £13.5 million to charitable causes on which both sides agreed. In addition to this, the Diana, Princess of Wales Memorial Fund had spent a total of close to £4 million in costs and fees relating to this litigation, and as a result froze grants allocated to a number of charities.

Use in popular culture 
In the Ben Folds Five song "Battle of Who Could Care Less", singer Ben Folds proposes taking an idea of "pewter portraits of General Apathy and Major Boredom" "to the Franklin fucking Mint".

See also

References

External links

1964 establishments in Pennsylvania
American companies established in 1964
Coin retailers
Companies based in Chester County, Pennsylvania
Companies based in Delaware County, Pennsylvania
Companies based in Manhattan
Defunct book publishing companies of the United States
Mints (currency)
Mints of the United States
Model manufacturers of the United States
Publishing companies established in 1973
The Wonderful Company